Backdraft is a fire special effects show at San Francisco and formerly at Universal Studios Hollywood, based on the 1991 film of the same name. Visitors could learn how the pyrotechnic effects were created and experience some of them first hand. It was the first attraction based on an R-rated film at the Universal theme park.

The Hollywood attraction was supposed to officially close after Labor Day 2009 to be replaced by Transformers: The Ride 3D in 2011, but remained open to appease visitors due to temporary closures of other attractions for annual refurbishment. The Hollywood attraction officially closed on April 11, 2010. The attraction remains part of the Osaka park. A similar styled show demonstrating storm effects, Lights! Camera! Action! Hosted by Steven Spielberg, opened at Universal Studios Singapore in 2010.

History
Following the 1986 success of King Kong Encounter during the Studio Tour at Universal Studios Hollywood, MCA (then-owner of Universal Pictures) began expanding the park as a must-visit destination in all of Southern California. In 1991, E.T. Adventure opened at the park, and a giant set of escalators called the Starway was built on the hillside that lead to various attractions, shops, and food courts. After the 1991 film Backdraft became a critical and commercial success, MCA Planning and Development (now known as Universal Creative) began constructing the attraction and opened it on July 1, 1992. The attraction has been ported to Universal Studios Japan on the opening day of March 31, 2001.

Summary

Queue
For the Hollywood version, guests entered a sound stage in the Lower Lot where Backdraft was being filmed. For the Japan version, guests enter a building facade in San Francisco and into a soundstage where Backdraft is being filmed.

Pre-show
As guests walk into the "Backdraft filming center", Ron Howard appears on a video screen and talks to the guests about making Backdraft. For the Hollywood version, guests enter another soundstage. For the Japan version, guests enter a set of a city alley, where the fire is burning the building. The stars from the film, Scott Glenn and Kurt Russell appear on the video screen and talk about the fire. The moment they finish, the fire surprises the guests. They are finally led into a set resembling the warehouse scene in the movie.

Main show
The guests line up on a tiered observation platform, overlooking a simulated warehouse scene. The main show begins with a narration, "There is a fire in the center office. It burned up everything in the room, until it ran out of oxygen. Oh, it may look quiet now, but that is its deception...for hiding inside are unburned natural gases. Waiting...for a breath of fresh air..." Suddenly, fire breaks out in the warehouse, causing a backdraft. A series of explosions creates more fire. After a final explosion, the platform on which the guests are standing suddenly drops a few inches. Participants are then directed to exit through the building. 

The sound of fire crackling can be heard throughout the show, but this is actually a sound effects recording. The fire is created by igniting jets of flammable gases, which are virtually silent.

In popular culture
The warehouse set was prominently featured in the television show Sliders, in the third-season episode titled "The Fire Within".

In an episode of Seinfeld titled The Trip, George Costanza expresses interest in seeing the attraction.

References

1992 establishments in California
2001 establishments in Japan
2010 disestablishments in California
Amusement park attractions based on film franchises
Amusement park attractions introduced in 1992
Amusement park attractions introduced in 2001
Amusement park attractions that closed in 2010
Backdraft (franchise)
Former Universal Studios Hollywood attractions
Universal Parks & Resorts attractions by name
Universal Studios Hollywood
Universal Studios Japan